Raoultella electrica is a Gram-negative,  non-spore-forming, rod-shaped bacterium of the genus Raoultella. The type strain of R. electrica was isolated from anodic biofilms of a microbial fuel cell fed with glucose.

Type strains
The type-strain of Raoultella electrica, 1GB is a facultative anaerobic and chemo-organotrophic bacterium, able to have both a respiratory and a fermentative type of metabolism. It is also able to use a wide variety of sugars as carbon and energy source.

Description
Bacteria from R. electrica species are Gram-negative,  non-spore-forming, rod-shaped, facultative anaerobic, and non-motile. Their width is approximately 0.3 µm to 0.4 µm for a length of 3.0 µm to 6.0 µm. They are able to grow at an optimal temperature of 37 Celsius grade but also 41 °C. Conversely to Klebsiella pneumoniae, R. electrica strains are also able to grow at 10 °C. However, R. electrica strains can be distinguished from other Raoultella species by their inability to grow at 5 °C. These bacteria are Voges-Proskauer positive and their ability to produce histamine has not been revealed.

Taxonomy
Raoutella electrica is the first species of Raoultella described since the creation of the genus Raoultella by Drancourt et al. in 2001. This species received the epithet of electrica (e.lec′tri.ca. L. n. electrum amber; L. suff. -icus -a -um suffix referring to; N.L. fem. adj. electrica referring to the generation of electricity) remerbering where the type strain has been isolated (anodic biofilms of a microbial fuel cell in Sapporo). The type strain is the strain 1GB. For its description, strain 1GB has been deposited in the Japanese and in the South Korean bacterial culture collections under the accession numbers NBRC 109676 and  KCTC 32430. Strain 1GB is also deposited in the DSMZ culture collection under the number DSM 102253.

Phylogenetic comparisons with 16s rRNA, rpoB, gyrA and parC genes from this species and those of others species from Klebsiella and Raoultella demonstrated that it belongs to Raoultella and confirmed the classification of this genus in a distinct cluster from Klebsiella.

Pathogenicity
The pathogenic potential of R. electrica is currently not known. However, this species has yet been isolated from chicken eggs in Jaipur (India) with a multiresistance profile.

References

External links
Type strain genome and plasmids of Raoultella electrica at KEGG database
 Raoultella electrica on ABIS Encyclopedia

Enterobacteriaceae